The Alberta Sports Hall of Fame  is a hall of fame and museum in Red Deer, Alberta, Canada, dedicated to the preservation and history of sports within the province. It was created in 1957 by the Alberta Amateur Athletic Union (AAAU).  The museum was eventually taken over by Sport Alberta in 1973 when the AAAU ceased operations.  It has been maintained by the Alberta Sports Hall of Fame and Museum Society since 1997. The first permanent display for the Hall of Fame was established in Edmonton in 1962. The museum relocated between Edmonton and Calgary on numerous occasions until settling in Red Deer in 1999.

Induction
Induction was originally limited to amateur athletes. In 1979, eligibility was also extended to professional athletes. In the Hall's early years, winners of major international competitions were automatic qualifiers for entry. However, that practice was ended by 1981 as part of a general tightening of induction criteria for such halls of fame across Canada. At that time, the maximum number of inductions was limited to seven athletes or teams per year.  Inductees are divided into several categories such as athletes, teams, builders, and pioneers. The provincial sports media members were also given the Bell Memorial Award

The first inductees, in 1958, were boxers Charles Cheesman, Wilf Greaves and Hugh Sloan, and track athlete George Sutherland.

Notable inductees

Individual persons

Groups and teams

References

Other sources

External links
 

1957 establishments in Alberta
Alberta awards
 
All-sports halls of fame
Buildings and structures in Red Deer, Alberta
Halls of fame in Canada
Museums established in 1957
Museums in Alberta
Sport in Red Deer, Alberta
Sports museums in Canada